Bois D'Arc is an unincorporated community in Greene County, Missouri, United States, approximately fifteen miles northwest of Springfield.  The community is part of the Springfield, Missouri Metropolitan Statistical Area.

A post office called Bois D'arc has been in operation since 1868. The community was named for an individual osage-orange tree (also known as a bois d'arc) which stood near the original town site.

References

Populated places established in 1881
Unincorporated communities in Greene County, Missouri
Springfield metropolitan area, Missouri
Unincorporated communities in Missouri
1881 establishments in Missouri